The Chromandi in Medieval bestiaries were a race of hairy savages with dog teeth.

References 

Medieval European legendary creatures